Mark Fields (born November 9, 1972) is a former American football linebacker of the National Football League.

Early years
Born and raised in Los Angeles, California, Fields attended Washington Preparatory High School, Southwest College, and Compton College. He transferred to Washington State University in Pullman, and played middle linebacker under head coach Mike Price. As a senior in 1994, he was All-Pac-10, and its Defensive Player of the Year.

NFL
Fields was the thirteenth overall selection of the 1995 NFL Draft, taken by the New Orleans Saints. He played six years in New Orleans, leading or coming close to the team lead in tackles.  He later played one year with the St. Louis Rams, appearing in Super Bowl XXXVI (losing to the New England Patriots) then signed with the Carolina Panthers in 2002.

However, before the start of the 2003 season, he learned he had Hodgkin's disease, and he was forced to sit the season out.  Both he and linebackers coach Sam Mills were sources of inspiration for the team, which made it to Super Bowl XXXVIII, but Fields again lost to the New England Patriots. Fields returned to play in 2004

Fields learned before the start of the 2005 season that his Hodgkin's had returned, and so he turned down a new contract offer from Carolina.

Personal life
On August 10, 2010, Fields was arrested for assaulting the mother of his then-six year old daughter while she was picking her daughter up from daycare. Mark would be charged for aggravated assault, endangerment, disorderly conduct, and interfering with an educational institution as a result.

His son, Mark Fields II played cornerback in the NFL.

References

External links
 

1972 births
Living people
American football outside linebackers
Carolina Panthers players
National Conference Pro Bowl players
New Orleans Saints players
Players of American football from Los Angeles
St. Louis Rams players
Washington State Cougars football players
Ed Block Courage Award recipients